Moonsorrow is a Finnish pagan metal band formed in Helsinki in 1995. Musically, the band incorporates elements of black metal and folk metal in their sound.  The band call their sound "epic heathen metal" and try to distance themselves from the term "Viking metal". They have distanced themselves from other folk metal bands, emphasising that their music is pagan and spiritual and is challenging for its listeners, rather than happy or danceable. The band members have varying levels of pagan belief but they draw on pagan spirituality for lyrics and inspiration.

History
The group's earliest formation consisted of cousins Ville Sorvali (vocals and bass) and Henri Sorvali (guitar and keyboards; also keyboards for Finntroll, Barathrum, and session member of Ensiferum) who released various demos that were much more characteristic of melodic black metal than future releases.

Their debut album, Suden Uni, recorded in early 2000, was released in early 2001, along with Tämä Ikuinen Talvi ("This Everlasting Winter"), a re-release of a 1999 demo. Suden Uni ("A Wolf's Dream") combined Finnish paganism and folk elements. After recruiting Mitja Harvilahti and Markus Eurén, Moonsorrow started playing live, releasing Voimasta Ja Kunniasta ("Of Strength and Honour") in late 2001. It was followed by their 2003 release, Kivenkantaja ("Stonebearer"), and Verisäkeet ("Blood Verses") in 2005. The album is also their first to use ambient sounds such as birdsong and crackling fire in between tracks.

In January 2006 the band played their first US show at the Heathen Crusade Metalfest in Columbia Heights, MN. On 7 March 2006 Moonsorrow announced a 2-album contract with Spinefarm Records, and that their next album was slated for release in late 2006. On 19 June it was revealed that the upcoming album would feature guest vocals by Thomas Väänänen, the former vocalist of Thyrfing; Viides Luku - Hävitetty ("Chapter five - Ravaged") was released in January 2007. The album contained only two tracks and displayed more overt influence from progressive rock.

An EP called Tulimyrsky was released in 2008. The EP is over one hour long and contains one new song (the title track), two remakes of old songs, and two cover songs. It was released worldwide by Spinefarm Records, and in May the German label Drakkar Entertainment released it in Germany, Austria and Switzerland.

In Fall 2010, Moonsorrow entered the studio to record their sixth full-length studio album, Varjoina kuljemme kuolleiden maassa ("As Shadows We Walk In The Land of The Dead"). The album was released on 21 February 2011 through Spinefarm Records.

In April 2012 Moonsorrow announced on their official website that they have signed a deal with Century Media Records.  The band commented: "We are thrilled to start working with Century Media, a label that is home to many fellow artists already! We never make our music half way or with compromises and we know our art is in good hands with people who have the same mentality in running a record label. Now, after a year since the release of our last album we are ready to begin creating something new. The new chapter in this epic journey of Moonsorrow!"

In June 2013, the band announced a vinyl box set of its collected works to be released through Blood Music. Given its planned size of thirteen LPs, it was advertised as the largest metal box set in history. Entitled Heritage: 1995-2008 - The Collected Works, the box set was released in 2014, and ended up consisting of fourteen LPs. (The same label's forthcoming box set for the Norwegian black metal band Emperor is intended to outstrip it in size.)

The band's seventh album, Jumalten aika, was released on 1 April 2016 through Century Media.

Lyrics
Moonsorrow's lyrics draw inspiration from Finnish mythology, legends and poetry. In the beginning the lyrics were written in English (the first demo was titled "Thorns Of Ice"), but since Tämä ikuinen talvi they have been written exclusively in Finnish (with the exception of a brief spoken-word monologue added to a re-recording of "Hvergelmir", which is in Swedish). For instance, the song "Sankaritarina" from Voimasta Ja Kunniasta features lyrics directly translated from Hávamál.

Relationships with right-wing extremism
Over the years, Moonsorrow has been accused a number of times of having ties to right-wing extremism. Moonsorrow side project Lakupaavi has used homophobic lyrics in their music.

In April 2008, Moonsorrow and other performers on the folk metal festival Paganfest were accused of being Nazis, racists and fascists by the BIFF (Berliner Institut für Faschismusforschung). Ville Sorvali of Moonsorrow and Heri Joensen of Týr issued a joint video statement to refute these accusations, noting that the bands are in no way connected to fascist groups and actually are against fascism.

After the incident with Paganfest 2008, the band has said in several interviews that they are not racist. Guitarists Harvilahti and Perttilä also took part in the "Blackout Tuesday" action on 2 June 2020, which supported Black Lives Matter.

Members
 Henri Sorvali – rhythm and lead guitars, backing and lead vocals, keyboards
 Ville Sorvali – bass, lead vocals
 Mitja Harvilahti – lead and rhythm guitars, backing vocals
 Markus Eurén – keyboards, backing vocals
 Marko Tarvonen – drums, backing vocals, acoustic guitar, percussion

Guests
 Thomas Väänänen  (Thyrfing) – guest vocals on Viides Luku - Hävitetty
 Hittavainen (Korpiklaani) – fiddle, jouhikko, recorder
 Janne Perttilä (Barren Earth, Rytmihäiriö) – guitar (live), backing vocals

Timeline

Discography
Studio albums
 Suden uni (2001)
 Voimasta ja kunniasta (2001)
 Kivenkantaja (2003)
 Verisäkeet (2005)
 Viides luku – Hävitetty (2007)
 Varjoina kuljemme kuolleiden maassa (2011)
Jumalten aika (2016)

Extended plays
 Tulimyrsky (2008)

Demo albums
 Thorns of Ice (1996, unreleased)
 Promo (1997, unreleased)
 Metsä (1997)
 Tämä ikuinen talvi (1999)

Side project: Lakupaavi
Lakupaavi (Liquorice Pope in Finnish) is a grindcore side project of the band. The project started as a joke: when Moonsorrow were recording their 2005 album Verisäkeet, they said in an interview that the album would be named Raah Raah Blääh and it would be very different stylistically than their previous releases. Although this was just a joke, many people took it to heart. Later they stated that it had been a joke, but they then decided to actually record one of the songs, called "Kuolema Taidehomoille... Ja Muille" (engl. "Death to Art Faggots... and Others"). It didn't end there, however: the band ended up actually recording the whole Raah Raah Blääh album and released it on the internet under the new moniker Lakupaavi.

References

External links

 Official Moonsorrow home page
 
 
 

Finnish black metal musical groups
Finnish folk metal musical groups
Musical groups established in 1995
Musical groups from Helsinki
Musical quintets